Qez Qapan Sang (also Romanized as Qez Qāpān Sang; also known as Qīz Qāpān Sang and Qīzqāppān Sang) is a village in Saruq Rural District, Takht-e Soleyman District, Takab County, West Azerbaijan Province, Iran. At the 2006 census, its population was 1,365, in 258 families.

References 

Populated places in Takab County